The 1986 Aerovías Guatemala air crash occurred on 18 January 1986 and involved a Sud Aviation SE-210 Caravelle III that crashed into a hill on approach to Santa Elena Airport, Flores, Guatemala after a short flight from Guatemala City's La Aurora International Airport. All 93 passengers and crew on board were killed, making it the worst air disaster in Guatemalan history.

Aircraft
The aircraft involved was a Sud Aviation SE-210 Caravelle III built in 1960. It was converted to a series 6N standard in 1962. Ecuadorian airline SAETA purchased the aircraft in 1975. Aerovías in Guatemala leased it from SAETA in 1985 in response to the increasing number of tourists visiting Guatemala.

Accident
Flores is a common staging point for visits to the ancient Maya city of Tikal. The aircraft took off on Saturday morning at 7:25 local time from La Aurora International Airport in Guatemala City with 87 passengers and 6 crew on board. After approximately 30 minutes the aircraft was cleared to land at Santa Elena Airport. However the first approach was too high and the aircraft overshot the runway.
On its second approach the aircraft crashed and caught fire about 8 km from the airport. The control tower's last contact with the crew occurred at 7:58, 33 minutes into the 40-minute flight, with no reports of any anomalies. The accident killed all 93 people on board: 87 passengers and 6 crew members. The aircraft was completely destroyed in the accident.

Cause
An investigation carried out  into the crash was unable to determine the exact cause of the accident. Low cloud cover may have caused the pilots to lose orientation and crash.

Notable passengers
Former Venezuelan Foreign Affairs Minister, his wife and two daughters perished in the crash

See also
Air New Zealand Flight 901
Prinair Flight 277

References

Aviation accidents and incidents in 1986
Aviation accidents and incidents in Guatemala
Accidents and incidents involving the Sud Aviation Caravelle
1986 in Guatemala
January 1986 events in North America